The Stoner–Keller House and Mill, also known as the Abraham Stoner House, John H. Keller House, and Stoner Mill, is a historic home and grist mill located near Strasburg, Shenandoah County, Virginia. The main house was built in 1844, and is a two-story, five-bay, gable-roofed, "L"-shaped, vernacular Greek Revival style brick "I-house." It has a frame, one-story, three-bay, hip-roofed front porch with late-Victorian scroll-sawn wood decoration. The Stoner–Keller Mill was built about 1772 and enlarged about 1855.  It is a gambrel-roofed, four-story, limestone building with a Fitz steel wheel added about 1895.  Also on the property are the contributing tailrace trace (1772), frame tenant house and bank barn (c. 1880), and a dam ruin (c. 1920).

It was listed on the National Register of Historic Places in 2013.

References

Houses on the National Register of Historic Places in Virginia
Grinding mills on the National Register of Historic Places in Virginia
Industrial buildings completed in 1772
Houses completed in 1844
Greek Revival houses in Virginia
Victorian architecture in Virginia
Houses in Shenandoah County, Virginia
National Register of Historic Places in Shenandoah County, Virginia
Grinding mills in Virginia
Watermills in the United States